Xenophon Emmanuel Kasdaglis, or Xenophon Casdagli, (Greek: Ξενοφών Εμμανουήλ Κάσδαγλης; 27 February 1880 – 2 May 1943) was an Egyptiote Greek – later a British citizen – tennis player. He competed in the 1906 Intercalated Games in Athens.

Career

Olympic games
Kasdaglis participated in all three tennis events (singles, doubles and mixed doubles) at the 1906 Intercalated Games. In the singles he had a bye in the first round and lost to eventual Gold medal winner Max Decugis of France.

In the men's doubles tournament, Kasdaglis paired with Ioannis Ballis and won the Silver medal after they were defeated in the final by the French team of Max Decugis and Maurice Germot. In the mixed doubles he partnered Aspasia Matsa. They had a bye in the first round; and in the semifinals, they defeated compatriots Esmée Simirioti and Nikolaos Zarifis in straight sets. In the final, the French couple Marie and Max Decugis proved too strong. Kasdaglis and Matsa were awarded the bronze medal, whilst the Silver medal was awarded to their semifinal opponents Simirioti/Zarifis.

National championships
During his studies in Paris, Kasdaglis participated in the French Championships, where he won the men's doubles final in 1898 aside Marcel Vacherot.
 
Back in England he was a finalist in the singles event of the Northern Lawn Tennis Championships in 1903 and 1907. In 1908, Kasdaglis won the All-England mixed doubles title with Charlotte Cooper and defended his title in 1909 with Maude Garfit.

He competed in singles and doubles events at the 1907 Wimbledon Championships. In the singles event, he won the first round match against E.W. Timmis but lost in the second round in straight sets to Wilberforce Eaves. In the doubles event, he partnered Major Ritchie and reached the semifinal, in which the eventual champions Norman Brookes and Anthony Wilding proved too strong. His second and last Wimbledon participation was at the 1922 Championships, where he played in the doubles and mixed doubles events and reached the second round in both. 
 
He is the brother of tennis player Dimitrios Kasdaglis, participant in both 1896 Olympic and 1906 Intercalated games.

Personal life
Kasdaglis married Lucia Agelastos in 1908 and became father of a son (1910) and a daughter (1911). In 1943, he died from complications after a minor surgery.

Notes

References

External links
 

19th-century Greek people
19th-century male tennis players
Greek male tennis players
British people of Greek descent
Olympic tennis players of Greece
Olympic silver medalists for Greece
Tennis players at the 1906 Intercalated Games
1880 births
1943 deaths
Olympic medalists in tennis
Sportspeople from Alexandria
Medalists at the 1906 Intercalated Games
Egyptian emigrants to the United Kingdom